Latirolagena is a genus of sea snails, marine gastropod mollusks in the family Fasciolariidae, the spindle snails, the tulip snails and their allies.

Species
Species within the genus Latirolagena include:

 Latirolagena smaragdula (Linnaeus, 1758)

References

Fasciolariidae
Monotypic gastropod genera